Seaman is a surname and a given name. People with the name include:

 Allen L. Seaman (1916–1944), U.S. Navy pilot
 Arthur Edmund Seaman (1858–1937), curator of A.E. Seaman Mineral Museum
 Bob Seaman (born 1931), American college football coach
 Christopher Seaman (born 1942), British music conductor
 Daryl Seaman (1922–2009), Canadian businessman and owner of the Calgary Flames hockey team
 David Seaman (born 1963), English football goalkeeper
 Elizabeth Cochrane Seaman a.k.a. Ellie Seaman (1864-1922), American journalist and philanthropist whose pen name was Nellie Bly
 Frederic Seaman (1906–2000), field hockey player for India
 Galen Seaman (1837–1932), member of the Wisconsin State Assembly
 J. C. Seaman (1898–1964), member of the Louisiana House of Representatives from Waterproof
 Justin M. Seaman, American filmmaker
 Keith Seaman (born 1920), former Governor of South Australia (1977-1982)
 Lazarus Seaman (died 1675), English nonconformist minister, supporter of the Presbyterian party, Master of Peterhouse, Cambridge
 Owen Seaman (1861–1936), British writer, editor of Punch magazine
 Richard Seaman (1913–1939), English racing driver
 Ryan Seaman (born 1983), American musician and singer
 Tim Seaman (born 1972), American race walker
 Seaman Jacobs (1912–2008), American screenwriter 
 Seaman Dan (1929–2020), Torres Strait Islander (Australian) singer-songwriter
 Seaman Squyres (1910–1979), American football player

See also